This is a list of notable events relating to the environment in 1948. They relate to environmental law, conservation, environmentalism and environmental issues.

Events

October
The Donora smog, an air inversion resulting in a wall of smog, killed 20 people and sickened 7,000 more in Donora, Pennsylvania, in the United States. It was a major air pollution incident in the US and was due to a combination of a specific weather pattern and pollution from industrial activity 
The Great Plan for the Transformation of Nature, put forth by Joseph Stalin, was implemented.

November
The takahe, a flightless bird indigenous to New Zealand, is rediscovered in a mountainous area of Fiordland. The population and range of the bird had been severely reduced following the human settlement of New Zealand.
The International Convention for the Regulation of Whaling came into effect.

See also

Human impact on the environment
List of environmental issues

References